Cenk is a male Turkish given name. The Turkish word "cenk" is of Persian word Jang (جنگ) and means "war" or "battle". Notable people with the name include:

Given name
 Cenk Akyol (born 1987), Turkish basketball player
 Cenk Gönen (born 1988), Turkish football goalkeeper
 Cenk Güvenç (born 1991), Turkish footballer
 Cenk İşler (born 1974), Turkish footballer
 Cenk Renda (born 1969), Turkish former basketball player
 Cenk Tosun (born 1991), Turkish footballer
 Cenk Uygur (born 1970), Turkish-American radio and TV show host
 Devrim Cenk Ulusoy (born 1973), Turkish free-diver
 Enver Cenk Şahin (born 1994), Turkish footballer
 Seyhan Cenk Tekelioğlu (born 1973), Turkish footballer

Turkish masculine given names